Dušica Radivojević (25 January 1914 – 16 August 1994) was a Yugoslav gymnast. She competed in the women's artistic team all-around event at the 1936 Summer Olympics.

References

1914 births
Year of death missing
Yugoslav female artistic gymnasts
Olympic gymnasts of Yugoslavia
Gymnasts at the 1936 Summer Olympics
Place of birth missing